Florin High School is a  high school in Sacramento, California. It is part of the Elk Grove Unified School District and serves the portion of southern Sacramento that is to the east of California State Route 99.

History
Florin High School opened in 1989, the third high school in the district.  It has since then remained in continuous operation.  The district named Florin High after Florin, a neighborhood in unincorporated Sacramento County, California that used to be a farming community growing primarily strawberries until a combination of the Japanese American Internment and land development replaced the strawberry fields with suburban tracts.

Architecture
Florin High School's architecture adopts the University of Virginia's "academical village" building plan.  This plan anchors the school on the library.  Two parallel rows of classrooms run down from behind the library with a manicured lawn in between the two rows.  Other permanent classrooms exist as contemporaries to the anchor architecture plan.  Since the school's inception, the Elk Grove Unified School District has added a number of other permanent and temporary classrooms.

Notable alumni 
 Ephraim Salaam, offensive lineman in the NFL, played for Atlanta Falcons and Denver Broncos.

Footnotes

External links
Official website
School boundaries

High schools in Sacramento, California
Public high schools in California
1989 establishments in California